Roanoke Canal is a historic canal located near Roanoke Rapids, Halifax County, North Carolina. It was built as part of the Roanoke Navigation System and extends from Roanoke Rapids Lake southeast seven miles to the canal's return into the Roanoke River at Weldon, North Carolina. The Roanoke Navigation System was planned to connect the Blue Ridge Mountains and the Atlantic Ocean. The earliest sections were built under the direction of civil engineer Hamilton Fulton.  Extant structures include the middle or lift locks, the aqueduct (1821-1823), and the three-story brick mill (1892) and powerhouse (c. 1904).

It was listed on the National Register of Historic Places in 1976.

References

External links
Roanoke Canal Museum and Trail

Canals on the National Register of Historic Places in North Carolina
Buildings and structures in Halifax County, North Carolina
National Register of Historic Places in Halifax County, North Carolina